Mohammed Adil Shah was the seventh ruler of Bijapur, ascending the throne in 1627. During his reign, he assisted the Mughals with their campaigns against the Ahmednagar Sultanate and signed a peace treaty with them in 1636. He died in 1656 and was buried in the Gol Gumbaz.

Rule

Although Darvesh Padshah was Ibrahim's eldest son, Mohammed Adil Shah was raised to the throne in 1627 on his father's death, at the age of fifteen.

Mohammed Adil Shah of Bijapur partnered with the Mughals in their conquest of Ahmednagar. Mohammed maintained friendly relations with Shah Jahan and made a peace treaty of 1636, after the extinction of Ahmednagar. By a firman of Shah Jahan, he got assurances for the end of Mughal aggression against Bijapur and due to his good relations with the Mughals, Shah Jahan formally recognized Muhammad’s sovereignty and bestowed upon him the title of Shah in 1648, the only ruler of Bijapur to receive such recognition from the Mughals.

The Treaty of 1636 with the Mughals sealed the expansion of Bijapur in the north. So, Mohammed Adil Shah extended his dominations westwards into Konkan, Pune, Dhabul (present Mumbai), southwards into Mysore, and eastwards into Karnataka, present south Andhra Pradesh and Tamil Nadu. During his reign, the kingdom attained its greatest extent, power and magnificence, and his dominions stretched from the Arabian Sea to the Bay of Bengal.

Besides territorial expansions, Bijapur also attained peace and prosperity during Mohammed’s reign. His kingdom yielded an annual revenue of seven crore eighty four lakh rupees, besides the five and half crores of tributes that were from vassal rulers and zamindars. Cultural activities like poetry, painting and architecture also received a great impetus. Mohammed Adil Shah did his best to emulate the glorious traditions left to him by his versatile father. Diffusion of general education and religious teachings were one of his chief concerns, and he did his utmost to improve the socio-economic and educational standards of the people.

Mohammed continued his father's patronage of the arts, though on a lesser scale. He introduced fresco paintings and portraits, the examples of which are the walls of Asar Mahal, pavilion at Kumatgi and Sat Manzil.

Rise of the Marathas
Mohammad’s reign witnessed the revolt of the Maratha general Shahaji Bhosale and then, the rise of his son Shivaji  to eminence and his founding of an independent Maratha kingdom, which was initially carved out of the Bijapur Sultanate. Muhammed failed to check the rise of Marathas to independence.

Death

After an extended illness, Mohammad died and was succeeded by his son Ali Adil Shah II.

Tomb

He was buried in the Gol Gumbaz, near the tomb of his spiritual teacher Hashimpeer Dastageer. Hashimpeer arrived in Bijapur at the rule of Ibrahim Adil Shah II. Hashimpeer influenced the rulers of Bijapur to give up their un-Islamic and heretic practices. Gol Gumbaz, located near the shrine of Hashimpeer, owes its completion to the 10 years of life that Hashimpeer granted to his disciple Adil Shah.

The dome of the Gol Gumbaz is the second largest in the world, 44 m (124 ft) in diameter. The Gol Gumbaz complex includes a mosque, a Naqqar Khana (a hall for the trumpeters, now it is used as museum) and the ruins of guest houses.

References

1656 deaths
17th-century Indian Muslims
Sultans of Bijapur
Adil Shahi dynasty
17th-century Indian monarchs
1627 in India
1656 in India